The Sri Lankan cricket team toured England from 14 May to 9 July 2011. The tour consisted of three Tests, one Twenty20 International (T20I) and five One Day Internationals (ODIs) between Sri Lanka and England.

Squads

Tour matches

First-class: Middlesex vs Sri Lankans

First-class: England Lions vs Sri Lankans

First class: Essex vs Sri Lankans

List A: Worcestershire Royals vs Sri Lankans

Test series

1st Test

Jonathan Trott's score of 203 is the highest score by an English batsman against Sri Lanka, beating the previous score of 174 set by Graham Gooch in 1991. Sri Lanka's second innings total of 82 was their fifth-lowest Test total. Thisara Perera made his Test debut for Sri Lanka in this game.

2nd Test

On the opening day, England's batsmen were reduced to 22 for 3, before battling back to finish the day on 342 for 6. This included a record stand for the sixth wicket against Sri Lanka, when Eoin Morgan and Matt Prior made 101 runs. Sri Lankan captain Tillakaratne Dilshan score of 193 was the highest score made by a Sri Lankan at Lord's and Dilshan's highest Test Match score. Dilshan also suffered a broken thumb from a delivery on the third day by Chris Tremlett that caused him to miss the Third Test. England wicketkeeper Matt Prior was reprimanded by the International Cricket Council for breaking a window in the dressing room after he was run out.

3rd Test

This was the first ever Test match to be played at The Rose Bowl. Sri Lankan batsman Lahiru Thirimanne made his Test Match debut. Chris Tremlett made his best Test figures to date with 6 for 48.

T20I series

Only T20I

ODI series

1st ODI

2nd ODI

3rd ODI

4th ODI

5th ODI

References

2011 in English cricket
2011
International cricket competitions in 2011
2011 in Sri Lankan cricket